Pedro Mazullo was a Uruguayan football manager. He coached the Chile national football team between 1936 and 1939, leading them in 1937 to their inaugural sport victory over Uruguay, Mazullo's native country, in a 3–0 win at the San Lorenzo de Almagro ground in Buenos Aires.

References

Chile national football team managers
Colo-Colo managers
Chilean Primera División managers
Santos FC managers
Uruguayan football managers